Epigrimyia illinoensis is a species of bristle fly in the family Tachinidae.

Distribution
Canada, United States

References

Dexiinae
Insects described in 1901
Diptera of North America